RCN may refer to:
 Radio Cadena Nacional (disambiguation), a broadcast network in Colombia
 RCN Radio
 RCN TV
 RCN Corporation (formerly Residential Communications Network), a cable television, telephone, and Internet service provider in the United States
 Radiowe Centrum Nadawcze, Polish designation for a broadcasting transmitter
 Reality Check Network, a software based warez magazine that existed from 1995 to 1997
 UWC Red Cross Nordic, a United World College in Norway
 Reformed Church of Newtown, a church in Queens, NY
 Republic of Cinnabar Navy, the setting of the RCN Series of science fiction novels by David Drake
 Royal Canadian Navy
 Royal College of Nursing, a professional membership organisation of the United Kingdom
 Rundstrecken Challenge Nürburgring is a motorsport event series mainly on the Nürburgring
 American River Airpark, IATA airport code "RCN"